Cross Currents is an album by the American musician Richard Souther, released in 1989 for the Narada label. The album reached No. 9 on the Billboard New Age Albums chart.

Track listing
(all songs written by Richard Souther except as noted))
Safe Harbor - 5:30
Cross Currents - 4:27
The Long Riders - 3:30
Banana Shakes - 4:56
Mary's Question (Richard Souther / Justo Almario) - 1:55
High Tide - 3:45
Just Dreamin' - 5:10
Between The Lines - 3:47
The Last Roundup - 2:48
All The Way Home - 4:55

Personnel
Richard Souther - keyboards, synthesizers, electronic percussion
Justo Almario - saxophone
Kirk Whalum - saxophone
Abraham Laboriel - bass
Dennis Holt - percussion
Alex Acuna - percussion
Randy Mitchell - guitar
Armen Ksajikian - cello

Charts

References

External links
Richard Souther/Cross Currents at AllMusic

1989 albums
Narada Productions albums